The Chaste is a fictional heroic mystical martial arts enclave appearing in American comic books published by Marvel Comics. The organization was depicted as being led by Stick, who was created by Frank Miller in the pages of Daredevil.

The Chaste appeared in the Marvel Cinematic Universe series Daredevil and the miniseries The Defenders.

Publication history
The Chaste was created by writer/artist Frank Miller, and first appeared in Daredevil #187 (October 1982).

The Chaste live in a remote wilderness location that can only be accessed by climbing "the Wall," a sheer cliff. The climb also serves as an entrance exam – those who fail the climb are not considered worthy. The primary function of the Chaste is to combat the Hand, an evil ninja group dominated by a demon.

Members
In the story arc detailing Elektra's death and resurrection, the members of the Chaste are listed as:

 Master Izo – Founder of the Chaste. Immortal martial artist, known to be more than 500 years old.
 Stick – Leader of the Chaste. He is known for his use of the bō (staff).
 Daredevil – Blind apprentice of Stick and former lover of Elektra. He is known for his use of his batons and heightened superhuman senses including hearing, touch and taste. He also possesses a radar sense.
 Stone – Stick's second-in-command and former lover. She can withstand any physical attack as long as she is aware of it in advance. In Ultimate Daredevil and Elektra, Stone is an elderly woman who taught Elektra the martial arts.
 Shaft – Uses a bow and arrow.
 Claw – Uses handheld metal blades (similar to Wolverine's adamantium claws) in combat.
 Flame – Power of pyrokinesis.
 Star – Uses shuriken.
 Wing – Power of levitation.

In other media

Television
Members Stick and Stone both appear in the Netflix show Daredevil. Stick is portrayed by Scott Glenn, and Stone is portrayed by Jasson Finney. Their first appearance is in the show's seventh episode, appropriately named "Stick". Stick plays an integral part in the episode, while Stone's appearance is far more minor, having occurred within the last few minutes, and, during which, his face is not seen. Stick reappears in Season 2, which explores his ties with Elektra Natchios and Chaste's war against the ninja clan known as the Hand, led by Nobu. In flashbacks, it is revealed that Elektra is the Black Sky, a living weapon worshipped and coveted by the Hand. After disagreeing with Star (portrayed by Laurence Mason) over Elektra's future, Stick kills him to protect Elektra and flees with her.

The Chaste return in The Defenders. The Chaste are revealed to be an army loyal to the Iron Fist, and serve K'un-Lun in their war against the Hand. Danny and Colleen are introduced trying to get information from a Chaste soldier named Shaft (portrayed by Marko Zaror) in Cambodia, but Elektra attacks them and kills him before he can give them anything. On their return to New York City, the two follow a trail that leads them to an empty warehouse littered with dead bodies, later revealed by Stick to have been the last members of the Chaste.

Film
The Chaste appear in the 2005 film Elektra.

References

External links
 Chaste at Marvel.com.
 Chaste at Marvel Wiki
 Chaste at Comic Vine

Fictional ninja
Marvel Comics teams
Marvel Comics martial artists
Daredevil (Marvel Comics)
Characters created by Frank Miller (comics)
Comics characters introduced in 1982